A tridecahedron is a polyhedron with thirteen faces. There are numerous topologically distinct forms of a tridecahedron, for example the dodecagonal pyramid and hendecagonal prism.

Convex
There are 96,262,938 topologically distinct convex tridecahedra, excluding mirror images, having at least 9 vertices. (Two polyhedra are "topologically distinct" if they have intrinsically different arrangements of faces and vertices, such that it is impossible to distort one into the other simply by changing the lengths of edges or the angles between edges or faces.) There is a pseudo-space-filling tridecahedron that can fill all of 3-space together with its mirror-image.

Examples 
The following list gives examples of tridecahedra.
 Biaugmented pentagonal prism
 Gyroelongated square pyramid

References

External links
Self-dual tridecahedra
What Are Polyhedra?, with Greek Numerical Prefixes

Polyhedra